Carbon-Based Anatomy is an EP by the progressive rock/metal band Cynic. It was released through Season of Mist on 11 November 2011.

History
Carbon-Based Anatomy EP is composed of six previously unheard tracks. However, the song "Carbon-Based Anatomy" is a reinterpretation of an older unreleased Æon Spoke single, "Homosapien". This was also done on Cynic's last LP, Traced In Air, as the track "Integral Birth" was an interpretation of Æon Spoke's "When Sunrise Skirts the Moor." 
The artwork was done by Robert Venosa, the artist who was responsible for all previous Cynic artworks. Venosa died shortly before the release of Carbon-Based Anatomy.

Three of six tracks are short, ambient-oriented pieces ("Amidst the Coals", "Bija!", and "Hieroglyph"), and represent an unprecedented musical direction for Cynic. Since the two previous hired musicians, Tymon Kruidenier and Robin Zielhorst, were let go by Masvidal and Reinert,<ref>[http://www.prog-sphere.com/2012/01/05/interview-with-paul-masvidal-of-cynic/ Interview with Paul Masvidal of Cynic, prog-sphere.com], (retrieved January 12, 2012)</ref> all guitar parts for this EP were recorded by Paul Masvidal. Bass parts were composed and recorded by Sean Malone, who had recorded on every Cynic release, with the exception of 2010's Re-Traced''.

Track listing

Personnel
Cynic
 Paul Masvidal – vocals, guitar, guitar synth
 Sean Reinert – drums, keyboards
 Sean Malone – fretless bass
Guest Musicians
 Amy Correia – female vocals
Production
 John Hiler – mixing, engineering
 Maor Appelbaum – mastering engineer
 Eric Greif - legal
 Robert Venosa - artwork

References

Cynic (band) EPs
2011 EPs
Season of Mist EPs